Nassa serta, common name the sertum rock shell, is a species of sea snail, a marine gastropod mollusk in the family Muricidae.

Description
The shell size varies between 38 mm and 70 mm.

Distribution
This species is distributed in the Red Sea and in the Indian Ocean along Chagos, Madagascar, Mauritius and Tanzania; in the Pacific Ocean along Hawaii and Eastern Australia.

References

 Dautzenberg, Ph. (1929). Mollusques testacés marins de Madagascar. Faune des Colonies Francaises, Tome III
 Houart R. (1996) The genus Nassa Röding 1798 in the Indo-West Pacific (Gastropoda: Prosobranchia: Muricidae: Rapaninae). Archiv für Molluskenkunde 126(1–2):51–63

External links
 

Muricidae
Gastropods described in 1789
Nassa (gastropod)